It's a New Day is the sixth album by Hitomi Yaida released on 22 November 2006.  The singles from this album are "Go My Way", "Startline", "Hatsukoi".

Released over a year after Here Today – Gone Tomorrow, this album is the first from Yaida after Aozora ceased the distribution and promotion contract with Toshiba-EMI.

A limited edition version was also released on the same day, containing a DVD of PV's and extras. The track  was also released at the same time as an internet only download.

Track listing

Notes and references 

2006 albums
Hitomi Yaida albums